The San Pedro y San Pablo Asistencia is an asistencia or "sub-mission" to Mission San Francisco de Asís in the San Pedro Valley in Pacifica, California. Established in 1786 at the Ohlone village of Pruristac, the site is located within the bounds of the Rancho San Pedro (home to the Sánchez Adobe).

History
Within the first year a chapel, granary, tack room, and three other rooms had been constructed, using native labor.  In 1788 two more rooms were added.  In 1789 a second granary was built, quarters for the mayordomo, and quarters for the missionaries were built. Also, a covered passageway which temporarily served as a kitchen. Crops of wheat and beans were planted and limestone was mined at nearby Mori Point in quantities to provide for the food and construction needs of the parent mission. At its peak the asistencia consisted of a three-wing main structure surrounding a central plaza. Corn, peas, barley, asparagus, and rosemary would, in time also be cultivated, along with grape vineyards and groves of peach and quince trees. Due to a significant decline in the native population due to several infectious diseases including syphilis (Stanger 1963), the population dropped from 300 in 1790 to 25 in 1792 at which point the facility was closed and used mainly as an outpost to graze cattle after 1790.

 
After secularization of the missions in 1834, Juan Alvarado, the Mexican Governor of California, granted the lands of the  Rancho San Pedro to Francisco Sanchez in 1839. Included were all of the buildings of the Asistencia. Sanchez retained ownership of the property after California was ceded to the United States in 1848. In 1894, roof tiles were salvaged from the property and installed on the Southern Pacific Railroad depot located in Burlingame, California (the first permanent structure constructed in the Mission Revival Style). Today, little remains of the original installation.

References

See also
 Mission San Francisco de Asís
 List of Spanish missions in California

Spanish missions in California
1786 in Alta California
Buildings and structures in San Mateo County, California
Pacifica, California
History of San Mateo County, California
National Register of Historic Places in San Mateo County, California
Properties of religious function on the National Register of Historic Places in California
1786 establishments in Alta California